Tanjung Sanctuary Langkawi is a resort located in Langkawi, Kedah, Malaysia.

References

External links
 Tanjung Sanctuary Langkawi

Hotels in Malaysia
Langkawi
Resorts in Malaysia